The Book about Moomin, Mymble and Little My was the first Moomin picture book by Finnish author Tove Jansson, published in 1952 in Swedish. It is the first Moomin book to be adapted into an iPad app.

Plot
Moomintroll is taking milk back home to his mother, Moominmamma when he meets The Mymble who is searching for her missing sister Little My. Together the pair go looking for her.

Style
The book is fully illustrated with all text written in rhyming verse in a box in the corner. Each spread in the book features cut-out holes, having the reader catch a glimpse of the next pages and anticipate 'what happens next' ('Hur gick det sen?' in the original Swedish language).

References

External links
Interactive Book app for iOS
Interactive Book app for Android
Interactive Book app for Windows
Moomin Trove
 

1952 children's books
Moomin books